The Wrocław–Szczecin railway is a Polish 356-kilometre long railway line, that connects Wrocław with Zielona Góra, Rzepin, Kostrzyn and Szczecin. The railway was assigned part of the European TEN-T route E59 from Scandinavia to Vienna, Budapest and Prague in 1991.

Opening
Construction of the line was led by Breslau–Schweidnitz–Freiburger Eisenbahngesellschaft (BSF), which was created in 1841. The first section of the line opened on 1 October 1871 and was from Liegnitz (in Polish: Legnica) to Raudten (Rudna) and Glogau (Głogów). This means that the line originally started in Legnica. From the late 1860s the line was extended as follows:

 December 1869: from Legnica to Lubina Górniczego,
 January 1871: to Rudnej Gwizdanowa,
 October 1871: to Czerwieńska,
 May 1874: to Rzepin,
 January 1875: to Kostrzyn,
 November 1876: to Chojna,
 15 May 1877 to Szczecin.

In August 1874 the line between Wrocław and Rudna, via Brzeg opened.

The final stations to be built were Breslau-Freiburger Bahnhof (Wrocław Świebodzki railway station) and Stettin-Breslauer Bahnhof (Wrocław Station) in Szczecin (originally under the name of Stettin-Breslau-Freiburger Bahnhof).

In the 1940s the Regalica bridge in Szczecin was destroyed, trains took a detour via Dabie station, where the locomotive had to run around to change direction.

In the years 1945 to 2007, several stations on the route have been closed, with a few new stations opened. Station closed in the 1960s or 1970s are Krzydłowice between Rudna Gwizdanów and Grębocicami, around the same time closing a station near Orzeszków koło Wołowa. In the mid 1970s, after opening the smelter in Glogow, the station Glogow Huta was opened. In the mid 1980s Czerna Mała station was built in the village of Cerna. The end of the communist era brought the closure of the Świebodzki freight yard in Wrocław and Chyrzyno station. In approximately 1991 Będów station was opened  between Czerwieński and Rzepin. The last station closed was Szczecin Klucz in 1997. Due to the high popularity of freight traffic, Kostrzyn freight yard has never been a passenger station, despite the construction of the platform. For technical reasons trains were not allowed to handle passengers due to the position of the Overhead Wire masts on the platforms.

Electrification
In 1979 electrification of the line was started. The dates for electrification are:

 1979: Szczecin Główny - Szczecin Port Centralny
 1982: Wrocław Główny – Ścinawa
 December 1982: Ścinawa – Wróblin Głogowski
 December 1983: Wróblin Głogowski – Czerwieńsk and SPA – Nowe Czarnowo (Dolna Odra)
 December 1984: Czerwieńsk - Jerzmanice Lubuskie
 May 1985: Czerwieńsk - Dolna Odra

Modernisation
On 29 May 2015, PKP PLK signed an agreement with the company Infra Silesia, in consortium with DB Schenker Rail Polska, on the modernisation of the second track between km 78.509 - 98.642 (Rudna - Głogów).

Usage
The line is used by the following service(s):

Intercity services between Świnoujście, Szczecin and Wrocław, along the length of the line. 
Regional services between Szczecin, Kostrzyn, Rzepin, Zielona Gora and Wrocław.

See also 
 Railway lines of Poland

References

 This article is based upon a translation of the Polish language version as of October 2016.

External links 

Railway lines in Poland
Railway lines opened in 1871